The Kokatahi River is a river of the West Coast Region of New Zealand's South Island. A major tributary of the Hokitika River, it flows northwest from its origins on the northern slopes of Mount Ambrose, reaching the Hokitika River 12 kilometres from  the latter's mouth at Hokitika. The two rivers between them share one of the West Coast's larger floodplains.

See also
List of rivers of New Zealand

References

Rivers of the West Coast, New Zealand
Rivers of New Zealand
Westland District